Henry Livings (20 September 1929 – 20 February 1998) was an English playwright and screenwriter, who worked extensively in British television and theatre from the 1960s to the 1990s.

Early life and career

Livings was born in Prestwich, Lancashire, England. He won a scholarship from the Stand Grammar School in Whitefield to the University of Liverpool but attended for only two years, leaving in 1950 without graduating. He went on to serve in the Royal Air Force (1950–52), became an expert cook, and held a number of jobs before going into the theatre. He trained as an actor at Joan Littlewood's Theatre Workshop, which he joined in 1956. Livings appeared in the first of the Carry On films, Carry on Sergeant (1958) and as Wilf Haddon, Martha Longhurst's son-in-law, on Coronation Street in May 1964.

His first stage play, Stop It, Whoever You Are, about a washroom attendant in a factory, was performed in 1961. The Evening Standard Awards for 1961 named Livings as Most Promising Playwright of the Year for Stop It, Whoever You Are, jointly with Gwyn Thomas, author of The Keep. Among other plays by Livings are The Quick and the Dead Quick (1961), an unconventional historical drama about François Villon; Big Soft Nellie (1961), whose witless hero creates chaos in a radio repair shop; and the play and TV comedy Nil Carborundum (1962), based on his experience of National Service. His play Eh? was performed Off-Broadway in 1966, with Dustin Hoffman in the leading role. Livings won an Obie Award for Best Play for the production. Eh? was turned into the 1967 film Work Is a Four-Letter Word, starring David Warner and Cilla Black. Many of the actors in this film were also members of the Royal Shakespeare Company, including Elizabeth Spriggs in her first screen role, and it was directed by RSC founder Peter Hall. His Pongo plays, performed in England during the 1960s and 1970s, have been described as Kyogen adaptations in a music hall style.

Livings also wrote short stories, plays and screenplays, and contributed to the TV series Juliet Bravo (1980) and Bulman (1985).

He collaborated with his friend, songwriter Alex Glasgow, who wrote the songs and music for the successful musical play Close the Coal House Door by Alan Plater. Together they starred in a 1971 comedy sketch series for BBC2, Get The Drift, based on their stage show The Northern Drift. Livings also jointly translated, together with academic Gwynne Edwards, three works by Spanish poet and playwright Federico García Lorca-–The Public, Play Without a Title and Mariana Pineda.

Books by Livings include That the Medals and the Baton Be Put on View: Story of a Village Band, 1875–1975, which relates to Dobcross Band, two volumes of short stories, Pennine Tales (1985) and Flying Eggs and Things: more Pennine tales (1986), illustrated by his daughter Maria Livings, and his autobiography The Rough Side of the Boards (1994), also turned into a stage show, which featured Arthur Bostrom in its premiere.

Livings died on 20 February 1998 at Delph, near Oldham.

Works

References 
 Henry Livings - Complete guide to the Playwright and Plays at doollee.com, Playwrights Database
 Henry Livings entry at Britannica Online Encyclopedia
 Henry Livings filmography at British Film Institute online database
 A Set of Kyogen Adaptations: Henry Livings's Pongo Plays by Anthony Graham-White (Emeritus Professor, Department of Performing Arts, University of Illinois)
 Review of premiere of The Rough Side of the Boards, Octagon Theatre, Bolton, 1997.
 Parables in Farce by John Russell Taylor, extract from Anger and After
 Encore, May/June 1962:  Review of Nil Carborundum by Irving Wardle

External links

English male screenwriters
English television writers
People from Prestwich
People from Saddleworth
1929 births
1998 deaths
20th-century English dramatists and playwrights
English male dramatists and playwrights
20th-century English male writers
British male television writers
People educated at Stand Grammar School
20th-century English screenwriters